Collegiate may refer to:

 College
 Webster's Dictionary, a dictionary with editions referred to as a "Collegiate"
 Collegiate (1926 film), 1926 American silent film directed by Del Andrews 
 Collegiate (1936 film), 1936 American musical film directed by Ralph Murphy
 "Collegiate" (song), song by Moe Jaffe and Nat Bonx

See also
 Collegiate athletics, athletic competition organized by colleges and universities
 Collegiate church, a church where the daily office of worship is maintained by a college of canons
 Collegiate School (disambiguation)
 Collegiate institute, a Canadian school of secondary or higher education
 Collegiate university
 St Michael's Collegiate School, Hobart, Australia
 Collegiate Gothic, an architectural style subgenre of Gothic Revival architecture